Napoli's Walls is an album by French clarinetist Louis Sclavis recorded in 2002 and released on the ECM label.

Reception
The Allmusic review by Thom Jurek awarded the album 4 stars stating "this record is full of sensual pleasure and an utterly accessible, often deeply moving articulation of a new musical language". In JazzTimes, Aaron Steinberg wrote "If you're curious about Sclavis' work as a leader, a great place to start would be the Frenchman's latest recording, the particularly pungent Napoli's Walls. Between 1987 and 1995, French painter Ernest Pignon-Ernest wandered around the Italian city of Naples, literally applying his artwork to the walls of the city. Pignon-Ernest's scenes depicting suffering and pain in a stark, classical style inspired Sclavis to form a new group and write new music in response. Sclavis has shown a particular talent for putting together remarkable bands tailored to specific projects, and this is no exception".

Track listing
All compositions by Louis Sclavis except as indicated
 "Colleur de Nuit" – 10:38 
 "Napoli's Walls" – 7:22 
 "Mercè" – 3:03 
 "Kennedy in Napoli" – 6:29 
 "Divinazione Moderna I" – 3:34 
 "Divinazione Moderna II" – 3:35 
 "Guetteur d'Inaperçu" – 8:23 
 "Les Apparences" – 4:39 
 "Porta Segreta" (Vincent Courtois) – 5:07 
 "Il Disegno Smangiato d'Un Uomo" – 7:12 
Recorded at Studios La Buissonne in Pernes-Les-Fontaines, France in December 2002.

Personnel
Louis Sclavis — clarinet, bass clarinet, soprano saxophone, baritone saxophone
Médéric Collignon — pocket trumpet, voices, horn, percussion, electronics
Vincent Courtois — cello, electronics
Hasse Poulsen — guitar

References

ECM Records albums
Louis Sclavis albums
2003 albums
Albums produced by Manfred Eicher